Frederick Midlane (28 March 1883 – 18 October 1976) was a New Zealand cricketer. He played first-class cricket for Auckland and Wellington between 1898 and 1919. In January 1915, opening the batting for Wellington against Otago, Midlane carried his bat to score 222 not out in a total of 498. At the time it was the highest score in New Zealand first-class cricket.

See also
 List of Auckland representative cricketers

References

External links
 

1883 births
1976 deaths
New Zealand cricketers
Pre-1930 New Zealand representative cricketers
Auckland cricketers
Wellington cricketers
Cricketers from Wellington City